Abū al-Ḥusayn ‘Asākir ad-Dīn Muslim ibn al-Ḥajjāj ibn Muslim ibn Ward ibn Kawshādh al-Qushayrī an-Naysābūrī (after 815 – May 875 CE / 206 - 261 AH) or Muslim Nayshāpūrī, commonly known as Imam Muslim, was an Islamic scholar from the city of Nishapur, particularly known as a muhaddith (scholar of hadith). His hadith collection, known as Sahih Muslim, is one of the six major hadith collections in Sunni Islam and is regarded as one of the two most authentic (sahih) collections, alongside Sahih al-Bukhari.

Biography
Muslim ibn al-Hajjaj was born in the town of Nishapur in the Abbasid province of Khorasan, in present-day northeastern Iran. Historians differ as to his date of birth, though it is usually given as 202 AH (817/818), 204 AH (819/820), or 206 AH (821/822).

Al-Dhahabi said, "It is said that he was born in the year 204 AH," though he also said, "But I think he was born before that."

Ibn Khallikan could find no report of Muslim's date of birth, or age at death, by any of the ḥuffāẓ (hadith masters), except their agreement that he was born after 200 AH (815/816). Ibn Khallikan cites Ibn al-Salah, who cites Ibn al-Bayyiʿ's Kitab ʿUlama al-Amsar, in the claim that Muslim was 55 years old when he died on 25 Rajab, 261 AH (May 875) and therefore his year of birth must have been 206 AH (821/822).

Ibn al-Bayyiʿ reports that he was buried in Nasarabad, a suburb of Nishapur.

According to scholars, he was of Arab or Persian origin. The nisbah of "al-Qushayri" signifies Muslim's belonging to the Arab tribe of Banu Qushayr, members of which migrated to the newly conquered Persian territory during the expansion of the Rashidun Caliphate. The 14th-century Arab scholar Al-Dhahabi stated that he may have been a mawla of Persian descent, attributed to the Qushayr tribe by way of wala''' (alliance). An ancestor of Muslim may have been a freed slave of a Qushayri, or may have accepted Islam at the hands of a Qushayri. According to two other scholars, Ibn al-Athīr and Ibn al-Salāh, he was actually an Arab member of that tribe of which his family had migrated to Iran nearly two centuries earlier following the conquest. The majority of Scholars including the Brillant Spaniard Muslim scientist (Ibn Al Hazm) considered him as an Actual member of Arab tribe.

Estimates on the number of hadiths in his books vary from 3,033 to 12,000, depending on whether duplicates are included, or only the text (isnad) is. His Sahih ("authentic") is said to share about 2000 hadiths with Bukhari's Sahih.

The author's teachers included Harmala ibn Yahya, Sa'id ibn Mansur, Abd-Allah ibn Maslamah al-Qa'nabi, al-Dhuhali, al-Bukhari, Ibn Ma'in, Yahya ibn Yahya al-Nishaburi al-Tamimi, and others. Among his students were al-Tirmidhi, Ibn Abi Hatim al-Razi, and Ibn Khuzaymah, each of whom also wrote works on hadith. After his studies throughout the Arabian Peninsula, Egypt, Iraq and Syria, he settled in his hometown of Nishapur, where he met, and became a lifelong friend of al-Bukhari.

Legacy
The Sunni scholar, Ishaq Ibn Rahwayh was first to recommend Muslim's work.

Ishaq's contemporaries did not at first accept this; Abu Zur‘a al-Razi objected that Muslim had omitted too much material which Muslim himself recognised as authentic and that he included transmitters who were weak.

Ibn Abi Hatim (d. 327/938) later accepted Muslim as "trustworthy, one of the hadith masters with knowledge of hadith"; but this contrasts with much more fulsome praise of Abu Zur‘a and also his father Abu Hatim. It is similar with Ibn al-Nadim.

Muslim's book gradually increased in stature such that it is considered among Sunni Muslims the most authentic collections of hadith, second only to Sahih Bukhari.

WorksSahih Muslim'': his collection of authentic hadith

Notes

References

External links
 
 Biodata at MuslimScholars.info
 Biography at Sunnah.com
Short Bio of Imam Muslim
Biography of Imam Muslim
English translation of Sahih Muslim
Interactive Family tree of Imam Muslim by Happy Books
Interactive diagram of teachers and students of Imam Muslim by Happy Books

9th-century births
875 deaths
9th-century Iranian people
Iranian scholars
Persian Sunni Muslim scholars of Islam
9th-century Muslim scholars of Islam
Hadith compilers
Hadith scholars
Muhaddiths from Nishapur
9th-century jurists
Biographical evaluation scholars
9th-century Arabs
Banu 'Amir